Terrence Lee Melton (born January 1, 1977) is a former American football linebacker. He was signed by the Houston Thunderbears as a street free agent in 2000. He played college football at Rice.

Melton also played for the Arizona Rattlers, Saskatchewan Roughriders, Atlanta Falcons, New Orleans Saints, Carolina Panthers and Baltimore Ravens.

Professional career

Florida Tuskers
Melton was traded to the Florida Tuskers of the United Football League on August 25, 2009.

References

External links
Just Sports Stats

1977 births
Living people
Players of American football from Miami
American football linebackers
American football fullbacks
American players of Canadian football
Arizona Rattlers players
Canadian football linebackers
Rice Owls football players
Houston ThunderBears players
Saskatchewan Roughriders players
Atlanta Falcons players
New Orleans Saints players
Carolina Panthers players
Baltimore Ravens players
Florida Tuskers players
Virginia Destroyers players